Collothecaceae is an order of rotifers belonging to the class Monogononta.

Families:
 Atrochidae
 Collothecidae

References

 
Monogononta